Fungisporin is a antibiotic with the molecular formula C28H36N4O4 which is produced by Aspergillus and Penicillium species. The cyclic peptide is a tetramer, consists of one each of the two enantiomeric forms of phenylalanine and of valine.

References

Further reading 

 
 

Fusarium
Cyclic peptides
Tetrapeptides